The Progress D-27 is a three-shaft propfan engine developed by Ivchenko Progress. The gas generator was designed using experience from the Lotarev D-36 turbofan. The D-27 engine was designed to power more-efficient passenger aircraft such as the abandoned Yakovlev Yak-46 project, and it was chosen for the Antonov An-70 military transport aircraft. As of 2019, the D-27 is the only contra-rotating propfan engine to enter service.

Design and development
The engine was launched in 1985 by the Ivchenko-Progress Design Bureau for commercial and military transport aircraft. It was designed to meet the expected growth in demand for new aero engines for civil and military applications.

In 1990, the D-27 engine was proposed for the 150-162 seat Yakovlev Yak-46 airliner. This twin-engined derivative of the three-engine Yakovlev Yak-42 would mount the two D-27 engines on the rear fuselage.

A single prototype of the D-27 engine was used for flight testing on an Ilyushin Il-76 modified as a testbed aircraft since at least 1992, in preparation for use on the Antonov An-70T military transport aircraft. The version of the D-27 for the An-70T produced  and now had  propellers. In 1993, the Il-76LL testbed with D-27 engine was put on static display at Moscow's MAKS Air Show, and the next year it flew at the ILA Berlin Air Show and the Farnborough Air Show. The testbed configuration made a final appearance at the MAKS Air Show in 1997.

On December 16, 1994, four D-27 engines powered the first An-70 prototype on its maiden flight. This was the first aircraft flight ever to be completely powered by propfan engines. However, the prototype suffered a crash during its fourth flight in February 1995, destroying the aircraft and leaving no survivors. Antonov constructed a second prototype, which made its maiden flight on April 24, 1997 with four new D-27 engines. During its test program, the prototype also flew to the 1997 MAKS Air Show and the 1998 ILA Berlin Air Show.

The D-27's three-shaft gas turbine engine has an axial low-pressure compressor, a mixed-flow high-pressure compressor, an annular combustion chamber, a single-stage high-pressure turbine, and a single-stage low-pressure turbine. The SV-27 contra-rotating propfan, provided by SPE Aerosila, is driven by a four-stage turbine via a shaft connected to a planetary reduction gear which incorporates a thrust meter. The eight-bladed front propeller receives most of the engine power output and provides most of the thrust, while the back propeller has only six blades. The propellers rotate at 1,000 revolutions per minute (rpm) at takeoff and 850 rpm at cruise. The engine has an overall thermal efficiency of 37 percent.

On December 23, 2005, Antonov announced that the An-70-100 was awarded a noise certificate stating that the D-27-powered aircraft met Stage 3 noise regulations, which permitted international airlines to fly the aircraft unrestricted. In response to the US Stage 4 civil noise regulations adopted in 2006, the engine was modified in 2007 to reduce noise by increasing the separation between the front and back propellers.

The Ukrainian armed forces accepted the An-70 with D-27 engines into army service on January 19, 2015.

On September 3, 2019, the Russian navy decided to order Beriev A-42 amphibious aircraft, the development of which had been suspended in 1993. The aircraft would probably use two D-27 propfans as the powerplant. The initial order was for three aircraft, but no timeline was announced.

Variants

Ivchenko-Progress worked on derivatives based on the D-27 engine core, mostly within the 1988-1995 time frame. Proposals included the following designs:

D-27A designation of the  engines for the Beriev A-42PE jet-powered search and rescue (SAR) amphibious aircraft, which was proposed in 1994.

D-27M a  variant.

This engine was intended for the Antonov An-170, a derivative of the An-70, and it was proposed for the Tupolev Tu-334.

D-527 an engine with an ultra-high bypass ratio of 18 that was considered for the Tupolev Tu-334. Nicknamed "super contrafan," the D-527 was ducted and had direct-drive contra-rotating fans mounted at the rear of the engine, like Rolls-Royce's proposed RB529 "Contrafan".

The D-627 had coaxial contra-rotating fans with a differential gearbox.

D-727 a variant for the commercial version of the An-70, called the An-70T. A high-bypass turbofan engine, the D-727 has a bypass ratio of 12.85. The D-727 was also the powerplant for the Yak-46-1, the high-bypass turbofan version of the Yakovlev Yak-46.

The engine was offered to power the Antonov An-148T and the Irkut MS-21.

Applications

 Antonov An-70 
 Antonov An-180 (abandoned)
 Beriev A-42
 Ilyushin Il-76 (testbed)
 Tupolev Tu-334 (rejected)
 Tupolev Tu-95MS (proposed re-engine)
 Yakovlev Yak-44 (abandoned)
 Yakovlev Yak-46 (abandoned)

Specifications

See also

References

Citations

Bibliography

External links

 
 
 
 

Propfan engines
Ivchenko-Progress aircraft engines